Dilnoza Kubayeva (born November 22, 1986) is an Uzbek theater and film actress. Dilnoza Kubayeva became famous for a number of numerous roles in modern Uzbek films. Kubaeva is best known for her roles in such films as Kelgindi kelin, Telba, Kechikkan hayot, Farzandim, Hijron and Ko'rgim keladi. In 2012, she was awarded the "". Since 2007, she has been working at the National Theater of Uzbekistan (Milliy teatr). Kubayeva has played about 30 large and small roles in various theatrical performances. She also takes an active part in public affairs and sincerely approaches every case. In 2010, Kubayeva was awarded the "Oʻzbekiston belgisi".

Biography 
Kubayeva was born on November 22, 1986, in Tashkent in an educated family.  She studied at secondary school No.255 of the Yashnabad district in Tashkent from 1993 to 1996, secondary school No.3 of the Sergeli district from 1996 to 2000, and the Republican Lyceum "Fine Arts", named after Alisher Navoi, from 2000 to 2003.

From 2003 to 2007, she studied at the Mannon Uygur Tashkent State Institute of Arts (Department of Drama Theater and Cinema). Upon graduating from this institute, Kubaeva received a bachelor's degree. Since 2007, she has been working as an actress at the Uzbek National Academic Drama Theater. In 2010, Kubayeva was awarded the badge "Oʻzbekiston belgisi", in the same year she took second place in the Republican contest "Eng ulug', eng aziz". Further, in 2012 she was awarded the "Shuhrat medali", and in 2021, she was awarded prizes and commemorative medals in honor of the "30th anniversary of Independence of the Republic of Uzbekistan". Her husband died in 2009. Her son Ahmadaliyev Muhammadamin was born on March 28, 2009, in Tashkent. Dilnoza Kubayeva also actively participates in prestigious state events, award ceremonies, cultural and performs at educational evenings and concerts of famous pop singers.

Acting 
Her theatrical debut took place in 2004 in the film Andishali kelinchak, and in 2005 in the film Taqdir charxpalagi.

Discography

Music videos

Awards
 2012 State Prize Shuhrat medal
 Honored artist of Uzbekistan
 2022 Honored artist of Karakalpakstan

References

External links

1986 births
Uzbeks
Living people
Uzbekistani film actresses
Actors from Tashkent
21st-century Uzbekistani actresses